VIA OpenBook is a laptop reference design from VIA Technologies, announced in 2008. The laptop case design was released as open source.

Specifications

Dimensions
Dimensions: 24.0w x 17.5d x 3.62h cm (at battery), (9.45w x 6.89d x 1.43h in)
Weight: under 1 kg

Processor, memory
 Processor: 1.0 GHz VIA Nano ULV
 Chipset: VIA VX800 unified
 Memory: DDR2 SO-DIMM up to 2 GB
 Hard disk: 160GB or above

Networking, wireless
 Networking: 10/100/1000 Mbit/s Broadcom Giga NIC Ethernet
 Wireless: 802.11b/g Broadcom or 802.16e GCT
 Bluetooth, Wi-Fi, WiMAX, EV-DO /W-CDMA, HSDPA, GPS options.

Peripherals
 Screen: LED 8.9" WVGA 1024 x 600
 Graphics: VIA Chrome9 HC3 DX9 3D engine with shared system memory up to 256 MB
 Card reader: 4-in-1 embedded
 USB: 3 x (Ver. 2.0 Type A Port)
 Audio: Realtek HD audio codec, 2 speakers
 Audio jacks: 1 microphone-in, 1 headphone out
 Camera: CCD 2.01 megapixel, dual-headed rotary

Battery
 Battery: 4 cell

See also

 Open-design movement

External links
 VIA Unveils VIA OpenBook Mini-Note Reference Design (Press Release)

References

Subnotebooks
VIA Technologies
Netbooks
Open design